If These Walls Could Talk is a 1996 American television film, broadcast on HBO. It follows the plights of three women and their experiences with abortion. Each of the three stories takes place in the same house, 22 years apart: 1952, 1974, and 1996. All three segments were co-written by Nancy Savoca. Savoca directed the first and second segment while Cher directed the third. The women's experiences in each vignette are designed to demonstrate the popular views of society on the issue in each of the given decades.

Debuting at the Toronto International Film Festival, If These Walls Could Talk became a surprise success and was the highest-rated movie in HBO history. It was nominated for four Primetime Emmy Awards, including for Outstanding Television Movie and three Golden Globe Awards, including Best Miniseries or Television Film.

Plot

1952
The 1952 segment deals with Claire Donnelly, a widowed nurse living in suburban Chicago, who becomes pregnant by her brother-in-law and decides to undergo abortion in order not to hurt her late husband's family. However, abortion at the time is strictly illegal. Claire eventually finds another nurse who provides her the phone number of a woman who can find her someone to perform the abortion. The woman on the phone tells Claire that the only trustworthy care provider she knows is located in Puerto Rico, and Claire cannot afford the travel costs—with air fare and hotel costs, the total trip would cost about $1000 (about $10,800 in 2022). After a failed attempt to end her pregnancy with a knitting needle, Claire contacts a man who comes to her home and performs a clandestine, hasty procedure on her while she lies atop her kitchen table. Claire finally manages to abort, but dies shortly afterwards due to massive blood loss.

1974
The 1974 segment deals with Barbara Barrows, a struggling and aging mother with four children and a night-shift-working policeman husband, who discovers she is pregnant, despite having recently gone back to college. She considers abortion with the support of her teenage daughter, but ultimately chooses to keep the child.

1996
The 1996 segment deals with Christine Cullen, a college student pregnant by a married professor, who decides on an abortion when he breaks up with her and only offers her money. After consulting with her roommate she makes an appointment with Dr. Beth Thompson. However, the abortion takes place during a violent protest and, during the actual abortion, an anti-abortion protester walks in and shoots Dr. Thompson immediately after she completes the procedure. Christine comforts Dr. Thompson as the doctor slowly bleeds out.

Cast
1952 segment
 Demi Moore as Claire Donnelly
 Shirley Knight as Mary Donnelly
 Catherine Keener as Becky Donnelly
 Jason London as Kevin Donnelly
 CCH Pounder as Jenny Ford

1974 segment
 Hedy Burress as Linda Barrows
 Sissy Spacek as Barbara Barrows
 Joanna Gleason as Julia
 Xander Berkeley as John Barrows
 Janna Michaels as Sally Barrows
 Ian Bohen as Scott Barrows
 Zack Eginton as Ryan Barrows

1996 segment
 Anne Heche as Christine Cullen
 Cher as Dr. Beth Thompson
 Jada Pinkett as Patti
 Eileen Brennan as Tessie
 Lindsay Crouse as Frances White
 Craig T. Nelson as Jim Harris
 Matthew Lillard as protester
 Rita Wilson as Leslie
 Diana Scarwid as Marcia Schulman
 Lorraine Toussaint as Shameeka Webb

Development
As executive producer, Moore spent seven years trying to get the film made, until the project was eventually greenlit by HBO. HBO vice president Colin Callender said "I don't believe there's a studio in the world that would finance this picture" and praised Moore and Cher for having the courage to use their celebrity to address the issue of abortion. Cher commented "It took someone with Demi's power and fortitude to have something like this made. Without that power, you couldn't do it. These topics are not on everybody's top 10 list of things to do."

Reception
The film received mostly positive reviews from critics. If These Walls Could Talk holds an 88% rating on Rotten Tomatoes based on eight reviews.

Among the positive reviews were Siskel & Ebert, who both gave the film "Two Thumbs Up."

Sequel
A sequel anthology, If These Walls Could Talk 2, aired in 2000. The subject addressed in it was lesbianism.

Awards and nominations
 Emmy Awards
Outstanding Made for Television Movie (nomination)
Outstanding Editing for a Miniseries or a Special – Single Camera Production (nomination)
Outstanding Hairstyling for a Miniseries or a Special (nomination)
 Golden Globe Awards
 Best Mini-Series or Motion Picture Made for TV (nomination)
 Best Lead Actress in a Mini-Series or Motion Picture Made for TV – Demi Moore (nomination)
 Best Supporting Actress in a Series, Mini-Series or Motion Picture Made for TV – Cher (nomination)
 NAACP Image Awards
Outstanding Lead Actress in a Television Movie or Mini-Series – Jada Pinkett Smith (nomination)
National Educational Media Network, USA
Gold Apple (won)
 Satellite Awards
Best Mini-Series or Motion Picture Made for TV (nomination)
Best Supporting Actress in a Series, Mini-Series or Motion Picture Made for TV – Cher (nomination)
 Women in Film Crystal + Lucy Awards
 Lucy Award (2000) to the Creators and Cast of If These Walls Could Talk and If These Walls Could Talk 2
 in recognition of excellence and innovation in a creative work that has enhanced the perception of women through the medium of television

References

External links
 
 

1996 television films
1996 films
1996 drama films
1996 thriller films
1990s feminist films
American thriller drama films
American drama television films
Films about abortion
Films directed by Cher
Films directed by Nancy Savoca
Films scored by Cliff Eidelman
Films set in 1952
Films set in 1974
Films set in 1996
Films set in Chicago
HBO Films films
American thriller television films
Films set in the 1950s
Films set in the 1970s
Films set in the 1990s
1990s English-language films
1990s American films